The Cleveland State Vikings women's basketball team represents Cleveland State University in women's basketball. Since 1994, they have been a member of the Horizon League. The Cleveland State women's basketball team was formerly in the North Star Conference (1988–1992) and Mid-Continent Conference (1992–1994). Prior to 1988, the Cleveland State women's basketball team was not affiliated with any conference.

Records

Individual-career points

Individual-triple doubles 
Only seven triple-doubles have been recorded in the history of Cleveland State women's basketball.

Record versus Horizon League
Records vs Horizon League schools as of the end of 2016–2017 season.

Record versus Ohio schools
Records versus Ohio schools as of January 30, 2013.

Record year-by-year

 Totals updated through the end of the 2016–2017 school year.

Head Coaching History

Conference tournament History

North Star Conference

Mid-Continent Conference

Horizon League

Postseason

NCAA Tournament History

WNIT Tournament History

WBI Tournament History

Championships 

Regular season
 North Star Conference Team Championships (0):
 Mid-Continent Conference Team Championships (0):
 Horizon League Team Championships (0):

Tournament
 North Star Conference Team Championships (0):
 Mid-Continent Conference Team Championships (0):
 Horizon League Team Championships (3): 2008, 2010, 2023

References

External links
 
 Cleveland State Vikings News, Scores, Schedule, Stats - Rivals.com